Miss International 1982, the 22nd Miss International pageant, was held on October 13, 1982 at Fukuoka Convention Center in Fukuoka, Japan and won by Christie Claridge from United States as Miss American Beauty.

Results

Placements

Contestants

  - Lou-Anne Caroline Ronchi
  - Anette Schneider
  - Mimi Dufour
  - Beatrice Peña
  - Carmen Júlia Rando Bonoldi
  - Laura Claudia Ciancolo
  - Adriana Rumié Gomes-Cásseres
  - Sigrid Lizano Mejía
  - Gitte Larsen
  - Anne Marie Jackson
  - Aino Johanna Kristiina Summa
  - Isabelle Rochard
  - Jutta Beck
  - Iro Hadziioannou
  - Donna Lee Harmon
  - Rose Marie Freeman
  - Jacqueline Schuman
  - Alba Luz Rogel
  - Isabella Kau Hung-Ping
  - Betty O'Connor
  - Martina Mary Meredith
  - Nava Hazgov
  - Antonella Cracchi
  - Yukiko Tsutsumi
  - Chung Ae-hee (real name: Chung Won-yoon)
  - Karen Seet Yeng Chan
  - Norma Patricia Méndez Tornell
  - Wendy Ann Thompson
  - Jeanette Roger Blixt
  - Maria Adela Lisa Gingerwich Manibog
  - Helena Sofia Sousa Botelho
  - Lena Masterton
  - Angela Tan Siok Ling
  - María del Carmen Arqués Vicente
  - Camilla Engström
  - Ruth Heinder
  - Claudine Tutea Cugnet
  - Kanda Thae-chaprateep
  - Mine Ersoy
  - Carolina Sibils
  - Christie Ellen Claridge
  - Amaury Martínez Macero
  - Caroline Jane Williams

References

External links
 Pageantopolis - Miss International 1982

1982
1982 in Japan
1982 beauty pageants
Beauty pageants in Japan